Glassell is a surname. Notable people with the surname include:

Andrew Glassell (1827–1901), Los Angeles real estate attorney and investor
Susan Thornton Glassell (1835–1883), the wife of George Smith Patton and George H. Smith, and the sister of Andrew Glassell
William T. Glassell (1831–1879), officer in the Confederate States Navy during the American Civil War

See also
Glassell Park, Los Angeles, neighborhood in northeast Los Angeles, California
Glassell Park Elementary School, elementary school listed on the National Register of Historic Places
Glassel railway station, Aberdeenshire